The 2019 Indiana State Sycamores football team represented Indiana State University in the 2019 NCAA Division I FCS football season. They were led by third-year head coach Curt Mallory and played their home games at Memorial Stadium. They were a member of the Missouri Valley Football Conference. They finished the season 5–7, 3–5 in MVFC play to finish in seventh place.

Previous season

The Sycamores finished the 2018 season 7–4, 5–3 in MVFC play to finish in a tie for third place. Despite being ranked in the top 25 at the end of the regular season, they were not selected to participate in the FCS Playoffs.

Preseason

MVFC poll
In the MVFC preseason poll released on July 29, 2019, the Sycamores were predicted to finish in fourth place.

Preseason All–MVFC team
The Sycamores had five players selected to the preseason all-MVFC team.

Offense

Ryan Boyle – QB

Dante Hendrix – WR

Wyatt Wozniak – OL

Jerry Nunez – K

Defense

Jonas Griffith – LB

Preseason All–American team
The Sycamores had one player, Jonas Griffith – LB, selected to the preseason All-American team.  Griffith was also named to the Buck Buchanan Award-watch list.

Ryan Boyle was named to the "College Football Performance Award" Watch List.

Schedule

Game summaries

at Kansas

Dayton

Eastern Kentucky

Eastern Illinois

at South Dakota

Western Illinois

South Dakota State

at Illinois State

Southern Illinois

at Northern Iowa

Youngstown State

at Missouri State

Ranking movements

References

Indiana State
Indiana State Sycamores football seasons
Indiana State Sycamores football